Hasanabad (also Romanized as Ḩasanābād) is a village in Bafruiyeh Rural District, in the Central District of Meybod County, Yazd Province, Iran. At the 2006 census, its population was 861, in 246 families.

References 

Populated places in Meybod County